Myristica beddomei is a species of tree in the family Myristicaceae. It is endemic to the Western Ghats, India, where it is frequent in the mid-elevation wet evergreen forests and an important food tree of hornbills. The species has been earlier misidentified in regional floras and herbarium specimens as Myristica dactyloides Gaertn., the latter occurring only in Sri Lanka.

Description 
Canopy and sub-canopy trees in tropical wet evergreen forests, growing up to 25 m high. The trees have a smooth blackish green bark that peels off. Inner bark is deep red and when exposed or blazed produces a red exudate. The cylindrical branches are arranged in whorls around the trunk and are held horizontally almost perpendicular to the main trunk.

Taxonomy 
Myristica beddomei differs from the Sri Lankan taxon M. dactyloides in leaf and flower characteristics. The latter has broadly lanceolate to broadly elliptic leaves with obtuse base, being brownish with indistinct veins on the underside. The male flowers have caducous bracteoles and the male flower buds are distinctly ellipsoid with pointed apex.

References 

beddomei
Endemic flora of India (region)